First American Bank may refer to several independent banks in the United States:

 First American Bank (Alabama) of Decatur, Alabama, now part of RBC Bank
 First American Bank (Illinois)
 First American Bank (Indiana)
 First American Bank (Louisiana)
 First American Bank (Oklahoma)
 First American Bank (Texas), now Citibank Texas N.A.
 First American Bankshares, Washington, D.C., the American unit of the Bank of Credit and Commerce International
 First American National Bank, Georgia, Kentucky, Louisiana, Mississippi and Tennessee, (defunct, now part of Regions Financial via its merger with AmSouth Bancorporation)